Thales Naval Nederland (formerly Signaal) MW08 is a G-band passive electronically scanned array target indication 3D radar, part of the 3D multibeam 'SMART' (Signal Multibeam Acquisition Radar for Tracking) family which includes E/F band (former S band) SMART-S/SMART-S Mk2 and D band (former L-band) SMART-L.

MW08 transmits six 2 by 12 degree stacked beams up to 70 degrees for height finding and is capable of fully automatic detection and tracking (ADT). The radar also directs gunfire against surface targets by 3 Track-While-Scan surface windows with splash plotting capability, but does not provide up-link commands to surface-to-air missiles in flight. In February 1996 Jane's International Defence Review reported that the radar was no longer offered to new customers due to Thales Group's product rationalization policy favoring MRR 3D radar developed by Thales France, formerly Thomson-CSF. However the policy has been quietly reversed.

MW08 is installed on the following ship classes.

 South Korea: 3 Gwanggaeto the Great-class destroyer, 4+2 Chungmugong Yi Sun-shin-class destroyer, 1 Dokdo-class amphibious assault ship
 Greece: 4 Hydra class frigates, 7 Roussen Class FACM
 Portugal: 3 Vasco da Gama-class frigate
 Turkey: 7 Kilic class fast attack craft
 Oman: 2 Qahir class corvettes
 Indonesia: 4 Sigma class corvettes

References

Naval radars
Phased array radar
Thales Group
Military radars of the Netherlands